Opeatostoma pseudodon, common name the thorn latirus or banded tooth latirus or red footed conch, is a species of predatory sea snail, a marine gastropod mollusk in the family Fasciolariidae, the tulip snails and spindle snails.

Distribution
This species is found on the tropical west coast of North America: in Southern Baja California, from Mexico to Peru, and in the Galápagos.

Description
The shells are white or brown with thin brown or black stripes. The body of the snail is reddish. This species has the longest apertural tooth developed by any gastropod. By means of this long spine or thorn (hence the common name) which grows from the tip of the snail's aperture, they anchor themselves in the sandy and coral rubble substrate.

Behavior
These snails live under rocks, usually partially buried in coral sand. They are active nocturnally. They mainly feed on small worms and on other gastropods.

References

 A. Robin – Encyclopedia of Marine Gastropods
 Arianna Fulvo and Roberto Nistri (2005). 350 coquillages du monde entier. Delachaux et Niestlé (Paris) : 256 p.
A. Keen, James McLean – Sea Shells of Tropical West America: Marine Mollusks from Baja California to Peru Hardcover – 1 June 1971
V. Alamo and V. Valdivieso – Systematic list of Peruvian marine molluscs

External links
 Animal Base
 Flickr

Fasciolariidae
Gastropods described in 1815